Chuck Finn is an Australian children's fantasy television series created by Paul Barron and Peter Hepworth. It was produced by Barron Television and aired on the Seven Network from 18 October 1999 to 25 December 2000, running for three series and 32 episodes.

Synopsis
Charles "Chuck" Finn is a 13-year-old Canadian boy who had just moved to the fictional town of Tingalla, South Australia situated next to the Murray River. At first, Chuck struggles to cope with having a new life and desires going back to his hometown in Toronto, but he then comes across a run down paddle steamer known as The Tingalla Rose. The vessel is occupied by two ghosts named Elvira "Fingers" Fitzpatrick, a Victorian era woman and Buddy Berry, a 1950s rock and roll singer who were both passengers on board when they died. He also befriends a group of locals; Hamish, Becky, Linda and Sarah McDonald, the latter who is the daughter of the current captain of The Tingalla Rose. These events lead to Chuck accepting Tingalla as his new home. The course of the series has the group trying to get the vessel back in business as it was in the previous century while competing with a rival vessel, The River Queen. They also come to terms with resident bully, Theodore "Tiny" Maloney and his friends, Davo and Spider.

Cast 
Luke O'Loughlin as Charles "Chuck" Finn 
Cassandra Kane as Sarah McDonald 
Johnny Nicolaidis as Hamish 
Larena Charlesworth as Linda
Amelia Knight as Becky 
Glenn McMillan as Theodore "Tiny" Maloney 
Thomas Lambert as Davo
Jonathan Tabaka as Spider 
Andy Seymour as Buddy Berry 
Holly Myers as Elvira "Fingers" Fitzpatrick
Irena Dangov as Edna Littlemore
Ted McQueen-Mason as Herman Littlemore
Carmel Johnson as Mrs Bonaface

Production
The series was edited by Tania Nehme, who went on to win several awards.

References

External links
 

1999 Australian television series debuts
2000 Australian television series endings
Australian children's fantasy television series
Seven Network original programming
Television series about ghosts
Television series about teenagers
Television shows set in South Australia
Finn, Chuck